Erik Joel Ramqvist (13 July 1909 – 25 November 2001) was a Swedish canoeist who competed in the 1936 Summer Olympics.

He was born in Skinnskatteberg and died in Uppsala.

In 1936 he finished fifth in the K-1 1000 metre competition.

References
Sports-reference.com profile

1909 births
2001 deaths
Canoeists at the 1936 Summer Olympics
Olympic canoeists of Sweden
Swedish male canoeists
People from Skinnskatteberg Municipality
Sportspeople from Västmanland County